Simon Bernhard Kochen (born 14 August 1934, Antwerp) is a Canadian mathematician, working in the fields of model theory, number theory and quantum mechanics.

Biography
Kochen received his Ph.D. (Ultrafiltered Products and Arithmetical Extensions) from Princeton University in 1958 under the direction of Alonzo Church. Since 1967 he has been a member of Princeton's Department of Mathematics. He chaired the department from 1989 to 1992 and became the Henry Burchard Fine Professor in mathematics in 1994. During 1966–1967 and 1978–1979, Kochen was at the Institute for Advanced Study.

In 1967 he was awarded, together with James Ax, the seventh Frank Nelson Cole Prize in Number Theory for a series of three joint papers on Diophantine problems involving p-adic techniques.  Kochen and Ax also co-authored the Ax–Kochen theorem, an application of model theory to algebra.

In 1967 Kochen and Ernst Specker proved the Kochen–Specker theorem in quantum mechanics and quantum contextuality.  In 2004 Kochen and John Horton Conway proved the free will theorem. The theorem states that if we have a certain amount of free will, then, subject to certain assumptions, so must some elementary particles.

See also
Ax–Kochen theorem
Kochen–Specker theorem
Free will theorem

References

External links
 

Living people
Model theorists
1934 births
Scientists from Antwerp
Institute for Advanced Study visiting scholars